Thomas Simpson was an English stage actor of the late seventeenth and early eighteenth century. His surname is sometimes written as Sympson.

He joined the United Company from the 1687–88 season, but his early roles are unknown. Following the 1695 split he stayed at Drury Lane with Christopher Rich's company and acted in a number of roles until 1702. From 1703 he William Bullock and William Pinkethman operated a theatrical stall at Bartholomew Fair.

Selected roles
 King in Agnes de Castro by Catherine Trotter (1695)
 Hottman Oroonoko by Thomas Southerne (1695)
 Curio in Neglected Virtue by Charles Hopkins (1696)
 Mufti in Ibrahim, the Thirteenth Emperor of the Turks by Mary Pix (1696)
 Don Leon in The Campaigners by Thomas D'Urfey (1698)
 Governor in Love Makes a Man by Colley Cibber (1700)
 Armando in The Perjured Husband by Susanna Centlivre (1700)
 Neoptolemus in The Virgin Prophetess by Elkanah Settle (1701)
 Du Law in The Unhappy Penitent by Catherine Trotter (1701)
 Lord Bellamy in Sir Harry Wildair by George Farquhar (1701)
 Meroan in The Generous Conqueror by Bevil Higgons (1701)
 Neoptolemus in The Virgin Prophetess by Elkanah Settle (1701)
 Uberto in The Patriot by Charles Gildon (1702)
 Mendez in All for the Better by Francis Manning (1702)

References

Bibliography
 Highfill, Philip H, Burnim, Kalman A. & Langhans, Edward A. A Biographical Dictionary of Actors, Actresses, Musicians, Dancers, Managers, and Other Stage Personnel in London, 1660–1800: Volume 14. SIU Press, 1978.

17th-century English people
English male stage actors
British male stage actors
17th-century English male actors
18th-century English male actors
18th-century British male actors
Year of birth unknown
Year of death unknown